1555 Dejan, provisional designation , is an asteroid from the background population of the central regions of the asteroid belt, approximately 22 kilometers in diameter. It was discovered on 15 September 1941, by Belgian astronomer Fernand Rigaux at the Royal Observatory of Belgium in Uccle. The asteroid was named after Dejan Đurković, son of Serbian astronomer Petar Đurković.

Orbit and classification 

Dejan is a non-family asteroid from the main belt's background population. It orbits the Sun in the central asteroid belt at a distance of 1.9–3.4 AU once every 4 years and 5 months (1,610 days). Its orbit has an eccentricity of 0.28 and an inclination of 6° with respect to the ecliptic.

Naming 

This minor planet was named after Dejan Đurković, son of Petar Đurković (1908–1981), a Serbian astronomer and discoverer of minor planets at the Belgrade Observatory. The official naming citation was mentioned in The Names of the Minor Planets by Paul Herget in 1955.

Physical characteristics

Rotation period 

In September 2016, a rotational lightcurve of Dejan was obtained from photometric observations by the Spanish amateur astronomer group OBAS. Lightcurve analysis gave a rotation period of 16.960 hours with a brightness variation of 0.41 magnitude.

Diameter and albedo 

According to the survey carried out by the NEOWISE mission of NASA's Wide-field Infrared Survey Explorer, Dejan measures 21.77 and 23.199 kilometers in diameter and its surface has an albedo of 0.053 and 0.08, respectively, while the Japanese Akari satellite found a diameter of 24.04 kilometers with an albedo of 0.068.

The Collaborative Asteroid Lightcurve Link assumes an albedo of 0.10 – a compromise value between the darker C-type and brighter S-type asteroids – and calculates a diameter of 19.21 kilometers based on an absolute magnitude of 11.7.

Notes

References

External links 
 Asteroid Lightcurve Database (LCDB), query form (info )
 Dictionary of Minor Planet Names, Google books
 Asteroids and comets rotation curves, CdR – Observatoire de Genève, Raoul Behrend
 Discovery Circumstances: Numbered Minor Planets (1)-(5000) – Minor Planet Center
 
 

001555
Discoveries by Fernand Rigaux
Named minor planets
19410915